Chacara is a suburb of the city São Tomé in the nation of São Tomé and Príncipe. Its population is 1,500 (2012 census).

Population history

References

Populated places in Água Grande District